Whiteia is an extinct genus of prehistoric coelacanth fish which lived in Madagascar and Canada during the Early Triassic period.

Taxonomy
The nominal species Coelacanthus evolutus Beltan, 1980 is a junior synonym of Whiteia woodwardi.

References

Triassic bony fish
Whiteiidae
Extinct animals of Canada
Prehistoric animals of Madagascar
Prehistoric lobe-finned fish genera
Fossil taxa described in 1935